Newfield is a village in County Durham, in England. It is situated between Chester-le-Street and Stanley.

Its services include the following: a mobile post office, primary school with a good Ofsted rating with some outstanding features, pub, beauty salon, a dental surgery, bakery/cafe and a lunch time take away cafe.

It also has won silver two years in a row in the RHS In bloom awards. This is a semi-rural area with great access to Newcastle, Durham, Sunderland and the market town of Chester Le Street.

Villages in County Durham